Fireworks policy in the United States can be different in each jurisdiction.

Classifications 

The United States government has classified fireworks and similar devices according to their potential hazards.

Current explosives classes 
The U.S. government now uses the United Nations explosives shipping classification system, which is based on hazard in shipping only, while the old US system also covered use hazards. The BATFE and most states performed a direct substitution of Shipping Class 1.3 for Class B, and Shipping Class 1.4 for Class C. This allows some hazardous items that would have previously been classified as Class B and regulated to be classified as Shipping Class 1.4 due to some packaging method that confines any explosion to the package. Being Shipping Class 1.4, they can now be sold to the general public and are unregulated by the BATF.

A code number and suffix (such as 1.3G) is not enough to fully describe a material and how it is regulated, especially in Shipping Class 1.4G. It also must have a UN Number that exactly describes the material. For example, common consumer fireworks are UN0336, or Shipping Class 1.4G UN0336.

Here are some common fireworks classes:
 Class 1.1G (Mass Explosion Possible:Pyrotechnics) UN0094 Flashpowder
 Class 1.1G (Mass Explosion Possible:Pyrotechnics) UN0333 Fireworks (Salutes in bulk or in manufacture)
 Class 1.2G (Projection but not mass explosion:Pyrotechnics) UN0334 Fireworks (Rarely used)
 Class 1.3G (Fire, Minor Blast:Pyrotechnics) UN0335 Fireworks (Most Display Fireworks) Current federal law states that without appropriate ATF license/permit, the possession or sale of any display/professional fireworks is a felony punishable by up to 5 years in prison.
 Any ground salute device with over 50 milligrams of explosive composition
 Torpedoes (except for railroad signaling use)
 Multi-tube devices containing over 500 grams of pyrotechnic composition and without 1/2" space between each tube
 Any multiple tube fountains with over 500 grams of pyrotechnic composition and without 1/2" space between each tube
 Any reloadable aerial shells over 1.75" diameter
 Display shells
 Any single-shot or reloadable aerial shell/mine/comet/tube with over 60 grams of pyrotechnic composition
 Any Roman candle or rocket with over 20 grams of pyrotechnic composition
 Any aerial salute with over 130 milligrams of explosive composition
 Class 1.4G  (Minor Explosion Hazard Confined To Package:Pyrotechnics) UN0336 Fireworks (Consumer or Common Fireworks) Most popular consumer fireworks sold in the US.
 Reloadable aerial shells 1.75" or less sold in a box with not more than 12 shells and one launching tube
 Single-shot aerial tubes
 Bottle rockets
 Skyrockets and missiles
 Ground spinners, pinwheels and helicopters
 Flares & fountains
 Roman candles
 Smoke and novelty items
 Multi-shot aerial devices, or "cakes"
 Firecracker packs. Although some firecracker items may be called "M-80s", "M-1000s", "Cherry bombs" or "Silver Salutes" by the manufacturer, they must contain less than 50 milligrams of flash or other explosive powder in order to be legally sold to consumers in the United States.
 Sparklers
 Catherine wheel
 black snakes and strobes
 Mines
 Class 1.4S  (Minor Explosion Hazard Confined To Package: Packed As To Not Hinder Nearby Firefighters) UN0336 Fireworks (Consumer or Common Fireworks)
 Class 1.4G  (Minor Explosion Hazard Confined To Package:Pyrotechnics) UN0431 ARTICLES, PYROTECHNIC for technical purposes (Proximate Pyrotechnics)
 Class 1.4S  (Minor Explosion Hazard Confined To Package: Packed As To Not Hinder Nearby Firefighters) UN0432 ARTICLES, PYROTECHNIC for technical purposes (Proximate Pyrotechnics)

Fireworks tubes are made by rolling thick paper tightly around a former, such as a dowel. They can be made by hand, most firework factories use machinery to manufacture tubes. Whenever tubes are used in fireworks, at least one end is always plugged with clay to keep both chemicals and burning gases from escaping through that end. The tooling is always made of non-sparking materials such as aluminium or brass. Experts at handling explosives, called pyrotechnicians, add chemicals for special effects.

Previous US DOT explosives classifications 
Explosives, including fireworks, were previously divided into three classifications for transportation purposes by the US Department of Transportation (DOT).
 Class A explosives included high explosives such as dynamite, TNT, blasting caps, packages of flash powder, bulk packages of black powder and blasting agents such as ANFO and other slurry types of explosives.
 Class B explosives included low explosives such as "display fireworks" which were the larger and more powerful fireworks used at most public displays.
 Class C explosives included other low explosives such as igniters, fuses and "common fireworks", which were the smaller and less powerful fireworks available for sale to and use by the general public.

At the time most purchases and use of all of these explosives, with specific exceptions for high explosives purchased and used in state, black powder used for sporting purposes and common fireworks, required a license or permit to purchase and use from the Bureau of Alcohol, Tobacco and Firearms (ATF or BATFE), or the state, or a local authority.

Consumer fireworks safety 

Availability and use of consumer fireworks are hotly debated topics. Critics and safety advocates point to the numerous injuries and accidental fires that are attributed to fireworks as justification for banning or at least severely restricting access to fireworks. Complaints about excessive noise created by fireworks and the large amounts of debris and fallout left over after shooting are also used to support this position. There are numerous incidents of consumer fireworks being used in a manner that is supposedly disrespectful of the communities and neighborhoods where the users live.

Meanwhile, those who support more liberal firework laws look at the same statistics as the critics and conclude that, when used properly, consumer fireworks are a safer form of recreation than riding bicycles or playing soccer.

The Consumer Product Safety Commission has guidelines concerning the standard of consumer fireworks sold in the US. Together with US Customs, they are very proactive in enforcing these rules, intercepting imported fireworks that don't comply and issuing recalls on unacceptable consumer fireworks that are found to have "slipped through". Bureau of Alcohol, Tobacco, Firearms and Explosives (ATF) is the federal agency that regulates explosives, including Display Fireworks in the US.  But, ATF does not regulate consumer fireworks that conform to CPSC standards.

The U.S. Bureau of Alcohol, Tobacco, Firearms and Explosives (ATF) as well as the U.S. Consumer Product Safety Commission (CPSC) have general jurisdiction over what types of fireworks may be legally sold in the United States.

The federal law is only the minimum standard however, and each state is free to enact laws that are more stringent if they so choose. Many states have laws which further restrict access to and use of consumer fireworks.

Citing concerns over fireworks safety, some states, such as California, have enacted legislation restricting fireworks usage to devices that do not leave the ground, such as fountains.  North Carolina limits fireworks to a charge of 200 grams of black powder. Massachusetts bans all consumer fireworks completely. Rhode Island, Arizona, New York, New Jersey, and Delaware have passed bills legalizing certain types of small fireworks. Vermont only allows sparklers. On the other hand, states such as Maine, South Dakota, South Carolina, Kentucky and Tennessee allow most or all legal consumer fireworks to be sold and used throughout the year. New Mexico allows all legal fireworks under state law; however, individual cities and counties may restrict or ban fireworks within their boundaries either permanently or when certain conditions exits.

Some states such as New Jersey vigorously enforce them. Each year, there are many raids on individuals suspected of illegally possessing fireworks.

Illinois only permits sparklers, snake/glow worm pellets, smoke devices, trick noisemakers, and plastic or paper caps.  However, many users travel to neighboring states such as Indiana, Missouri, Kentucky, and Wisconsin to obtain fireworks for use in Illinois. This situation is similar to the plight of many St. Louis residents as fireworks are illegal within both city and county limits. However, fireworks are readily available in nearby St. Charles County.

Differences in legislation among states have led to many fireworks suppliers setting up shop along state borders, to sell to customers from neighboring states where fireworks are restricted. Some Native American tribes on reservation lands sell fireworks that are not legal for sale outside the reservation.

The type of fireworks sold in the United States range from those permitted under federal law to illegal explosive devices and professional fireworks sold on the black market. Both the illicit manufacture and diversion of illegal explosives to the consumer market have become a growing problem in recent years.

Display fireworks safety 
Federal, state, and local authorities govern the use of display fireworks in the United States. At the federal level, the National Fire Protection Association (NFPA) sets forth a set of codes which give the minimum standards of display fireworks use and safety in the US. Both state and local jurisdictions can further add restrictions on the use and safety requirements of display fireworks. Typically, these jurisdictions will require a licensed operator to discharge the show. Although requirements vary from state to state, licensed operators and their crew are typically required to have hours of extensive training in the Safe use of display fireworks.

These codes can include, but are not limited to, distance from the audience, maximum size shell, firing location requirements, electrical firing system requirements, and the minimum safety gear to be worn by the fireworks crew. These guidelines are explained in the NFPA 1123 fireworks code.

See also 
 Fireworks policy in the European Union

References 

United States
Safety in the United States
Law of the United States